DGAC can refer to:
 Dirección General de Aviación Civil (disambiguation) (various organizations)
 Dirección General de Aeronáutica Civil (disambiguation) (various organizations)
 Directorate General for Civil Aviation (France)
 Directorate General of Civil Aviation (Turkey)
 Dietary Guidelines Advisory Committee (USA)